Kellie K. Warren (born February 18, 1969) is an American politician from the state of Kansas, and former real estate attorney. A Republican, Warren serves as a member of the Kansas Senate, representing the 11th District. She has represented the 28th district in the Kansas House of Representatives, based in eastern Johnson County.

Career
Warren is an attorney by trade, working at Shook, Hardy, and Bacon from 2006 until 2013, and Property Law Firm from 2013 on. Her political career began in 2018, when she challenged moderate Republican State Representative Joy Koesten in the Republican primary for the 28th district; Warren won the primary election 58-42%, and defeated Democrat Brian Clausen in November.

In 2020, Warren announced a primary challenge to State Senator John Skubal in the Senate's 11th district, an election she won 64-36%. Warren faced Koesten, now a Democrat, in the competitive general election for the seat, defeating her 53-47%.

In 2022, Warren ran unsuccessfully for Kansas Attorney General, narrowly losing in the Republican primary to Kris Kobach.

Personal life
Warren lives in Leawood with her husband and their four children.

References

External links
Vote Smart Kellie Warren

1969 births
21st-century American politicians
21st-century American women politicians
Cornell University alumni
Republican Party Kansas state senators
Living people
Republican Party members of the Kansas House of Representatives
University of Kansas School of Law alumni
Women state legislators in Kansas